Estoloides paralboscutellaris is a species of beetle in the family Cerambycidae. It was described by Stephan von Breuning in 1971. It is known from Mexico.

References

Estoloides
Beetles described in 1971